Karakurussi  is a village in the Palakkad district, state of Kerala, India. It is administered by its own gram panchayat

Location
Karakurussi is located approximately 4 km from the National Highway 966 which connects Palakkad, Malappuram and Kozhikode districts headquarters of Kerala. It is also 32 km from the district headquarters. It comes under the Mannarkkad Taluk.

Demographics
 India census, Karakurissi had a population of 25,161 with 12,136 males and 13,025 females.

References
Notes

Citations

External links
 Location

Karakurissi